Cabin pressurization is a process in which conditioned air is pumped into the cabin of an aircraft or spacecraft in order to create a safe and comfortable environment for passengers and crew flying at high altitudes. For aircraft, this air is usually bled off from the gas turbine engines at the compressor stage, and for spacecraft, it is carried in high-pressure, often cryogenic, tanks. The air is cooled, humidified, and mixed with recirculated air if necessary before it is distributed to the cabin by one or more environmental control systems. The cabin pressure is regulated by the outflow valve.

While the first experimental pressurization systems saw use during the 1920s and 1930s, it was not until 1940 that a commercial aircraft would enter service with a pressurized cabin, when the Boeing 307 Stratoliner joined the Transcontinental & Western Air and Pan American Airways fleets. The practice would become widespread a decade later, particularly with the introduction of the British de Havilland Comet jetliner in 1949. While initially a success, two catastrophic failures in 1954 temporarily grounded the worldwide fleet. The cause was found to be a combination of progressive metal fatigue and aircraft skin stresses, both of which aeronautical engineers had limited understanding at the time. Testing involved multiple full scale pressurisation cycle tests of the entire fuselage in a water tank. The key engineering principles learned from the Comet were applied directly to the design of all subsequent jet airliners, such as the Boeing 707.

Certain aircraft have presented unusual pressurization scenarios. This not only increased airframe weight, but also saw the use of smaller cabin windows than most other commercial passenger aircraft, intended to slow the decompression rate if a depressurization event occurred. The Aloha Airlines Flight 243 incident, involving a Boeing 737-200 that suffered catastrophic cabin failure mid-flight, was primarily caused by its continued operation despite having accumulated more than twice the number of flight cycles that the airframe was designed to endure. For increased passenger comfort, several modern airliners, such as the Boeing 787 Dreamliner and the Airbus A350 XWB, feature reduced operating cabin altitudes as well as greater humidity levels; the use of composite airframes has aided the adoption of such comfort-maximising practices.

Need for cabin pressurization

For private aircraft operating in the US, crew members are required to use oxygen masks if the cabin altitude (a representation of the air pressure, see below) stays above  for more than 30 minutes, or if the cabin altitude reaches  at any time. At altitudes above , passengers are required to be provided oxygen masks as well. Pressurization of the cargo hold is also required to prevent damage to pressure-sensitive goods that might leak, expand, burst or be crushed on re-pressurization. The principal physiological problems are listed below.

 Hypoxia
 The lower partial pressure of oxygen at high altitude reduces the alveolar oxygen tension in the lungs and subsequently in the brain, leading to sluggish thinking, dimmed vision, loss of consciousness, and ultimately death. At this altitude, there is about 25% less oxygen than there is at sea level.
 Hypoxia may be addressed by the administration of supplemental oxygen, either through an oxygen mask or through a nasal cannula. At , the ambient air pressure falls to about 0.2 bar, at which maintaining a minimum partial pressure of oxygen of 0.2 bar requires breathing 100% oxygen using an oxygen mask.
 Emergency oxygen supply masks in the passenger compartment of airliners do not need to be pressure-demand masks because most flights stay below . Above that altitude the partial pressure of oxygen will fall below 0.2 bar even at 100% oxygen and some degree of cabin pressurization or rapid descent will be essential to avoid the risk of hypoxia.
 Altitude sickness
 Hyperventilation, the body's most common response to hypoxia, does help to partially restore the partial pressure of oxygen in the blood, but it also causes carbon dioxide (CO2) to out-gas, raising the blood pH and inducing alkalosis. Passengers may experience fatigue, nausea, headaches, sleeplessness, and (on extended flights) even pulmonary edema. These are the same symptoms that mountain climbers experience, but the limited duration of powered flight makes the development of pulmonary oedema unlikely. Altitude sickness may be controlled by a full pressure suit with helmet and faceplate, which completely envelops the body in a pressurized environment; however, this is impractical for commercial passengers.
 Decompression sickness
 The low partial pressure of gases, principally nitrogen (N2) but including all other gases, may cause dissolved gases in the bloodstream to precipitate out, resulting in gas embolism, or bubbles in the bloodstream. The mechanism is the same as that of compressed-air divers on ascent from depth. Symptoms may include the early symptoms of "the bends"—tiredness, forgetfulness, headache, stroke, thrombosis, and subcutaneous itching—but rarely the full symptoms thereof. Decompression sickness may also be controlled by a full-pressure suit as for altitude sickness.
 Barotrauma
 As the aircraft climbs or descends, passengers may experience discomfort or acute pain as gases trapped within their bodies expand or contract. The most common problems occur with air trapped in the middle ear (aerotitis) or paranasal sinuses by a blocked Eustachian tube or sinuses. Pain may also be experienced in the gastrointestinal tract or even the teeth (barodontalgia). Usually these are not severe enough to cause actual trauma but can result in soreness in the ear that persists after the flight and can exacerbate or precipitate pre-existing medical conditions, such as pneumothorax.

Cabin altitude

The pressure inside the cabin is technically referred to as the equivalent effective cabin altitude or more commonly as the cabin altitude. This is defined as the equivalent altitude above mean sea level having the same atmospheric pressure according to a standard atmospheric model such as the International Standard Atmosphere. Thus a cabin altitude of zero would have the pressure found at mean sea level, which is taken to be .

Aircraft
In airliners, cabin altitude during flight is kept above sea level in order to reduce stress on the pressurized part of the fuselage; this stress is proportional to the difference in pressure inside and outside the cabin. This cabin altitude is maintained while the aircraft is cruising at its maximum altitude and then reduced gradually during descent until the cabin pressure matches the ambient air pressure at the destination.

Keeping the cabin altitude below  generally prevents significant hypoxia, altitude sickness, decompression sickness, and barotrauma. Federal Aviation Administration (FAA) regulations in the U.S. mandate that under normal operating conditions, the cabin altitude may not exceed this limit at the maximum operating altitude of the aircraft. This mandatory maximum cabin altitude does not eliminate all physiological problems; passengers with conditions such as pneumothorax are advised not to fly until fully healed, and people suffering from a cold or other infection may still experience pain in the ears and sinuses. The rate of change of cabin altitude strongly affects comfort as humans are sensitive to pressure changes in the inner ear and sinuses and this has to be managed carefully. Scuba divers flying within the "no fly" period after a dive are at risk of decompression sickness because the accumulated nitrogen in their bodies can form bubbles when exposed to reduced cabin pressure.

This is typical for older jet airliners. A design goal for many, but not all, newer aircraft is to provide a lower cabin altitude than older designs. This can be beneficial for passenger comfort.

Before 1996, approximately 6,000 large commercial transport airplanes were assigned a type certificate to fly up to  without having to meet high-altitude special conditions. In 1996, the FAA adopted Amendment 25-87, which imposed additional high-altitude cabin pressure specifications for new-type aircraft designs. Aircraft certified to operate above  "must be designed so that occupants will not be exposed to cabin pressure altitudes in excess of  after any probable failure condition in the pressurization system". In the event of a decompression that results from "any failure condition not shown to be extremely improbable", the plane must be designed such that occupants will not be exposed to a cabin altitude exceeding  for more than 2 minutes, nor to an altitude exceeding  at any time. Aircraft manufacturers can apply for a relaxation of this rule if the circumstances warrant it. In 2004, Airbus acquired an FAA exemption to allow the cabin altitude of the A380 to reach  in the event of a decompression incident and to exceed  for one minute. This allows the A380 to operate at a higher altitude than other newly designed civilian aircraft.

Spacecraft
Russian engineers used an air-like nitrogen/oxygen mixture, kept at a cabin altitude near zero at all times, in their 1961 Vostok, 1964 Voskhod, and 1967 to present Soyuz spacecraft. This requires a heavier space vehicle design, because the spacecraft cabin structure must withstand the stress of 14.7 pounds per square inch (1 atm, 1.01 bar) against the vacuum of space, and also because an inert nitrogen mass must be carried. Care must also be taken to avoid decompression sickness when cosmonauts perform extravehicular activity, as current soft space suits are pressurized with pure oxygen at relatively low pressure in order to provide reasonable flexibility.

By contrast, the United States used a pure oxygen atmosphere for its 1961 Mercury, 1965 Gemini, and 1967 Apollo spacecraft, mainly in order to avoid decompression sickness. This allowed for a lighter space vehicle design. This is possible because at 100% oxygen, enough oxygen gets to the bloodstream to allow astronauts to operate normally. However, the high pressure pure oxygen atmosphere proved to be a factor in a fatal fire hazard in Apollo, contributing to the deaths of the entire crew of Apollo 1 during a 1967 ground test.

After the Apollo program, the United States used standard air-like cabin atmospheres for Skylab, the Space Shuttle orbiter, and the International Space Station.

Mechanics
Pressurization is achieved by the design of an airtight fuselage engineered to be pressurized with a source of compressed air and controlled by an environmental control system (ECS). The most common source of compressed air for pressurization is bleed air extracted from the compressor stage of a gas turbine engine, from a low or intermediate stage and also from an additional high stage; the exact stage can vary depending on engine type. The control and selection of high or low bleed sources is fully automatic and is governed by the needs of various pneumatic systems at various stages of flight.

The part of the bleed air that is directed to the ECS is then expanded to bring it to cabin pressure, which cools it. A final, suitable temperature is then achieved by adding back heat from the hot compressed air via a heat exchanger and air cycle machine known as a PAC (Pressurization and Air Conditioning) system. In some larger airliners, hot trim air can be added downstream of air conditioned air coming from the packs if it is needed to warm a section of the cabin that is colder than others.

At least two engines provide compressed bleed air for all the plane's pneumatic systems, to provide full redundancy. Compressed air is also obtained from the auxiliary power unit (APU), if fitted, in the event of an emergency and for cabin air supply on the ground before the main engines are started. Most modern commercial aircraft today have fully redundant, duplicated electronic controllers for maintaining pressurization along with a manual back-up control system.

All exhaust air is dumped to atmosphere via an outflow valve, usually at the rear of the fuselage. This valve controls the cabin pressure and also acts as a safety relief valve, in addition to other safety relief valves. If the automatic pressure controllers fail, the pilot can manually control the cabin pressure valve, according to the backup emergency procedure checklist. The automatic controller normally maintains the proper cabin pressure altitude by constantly adjusting the outflow valve position so that the cabin altitude is as low as practical without exceeding the maximum pressure differential limit on the fuselage.

Some aircraft, such as the Boeing 787 Dreamliner, have re-introduced electric compressors previously used on piston-engined airliners to provide pressurization. The use of electric compressors increases the electrical generation load on the engines and introduces a number of stages of energy transfer; therefore, it is unclear whether this increases the overall efficiency of the aircraft air handling system. It does, however, remove the danger of chemical contamination of the cabin, simplify engine design, avert the need to run high pressure pipework around the aircraft, and provide greater design flexibility.

Unplanned decompression

Unplanned loss of cabin pressure at altitude/in space is rare but has resulted in a number of fatal accidents. Failures range from sudden, catastrophic loss of airframe integrity (explosive decompression) to slow leaks or equipment malfunctions that allow cabin pressure to drop.

The oxygen systems have sufficient oxygen for all on board and give the pilots adequate time to descend to below . Without emergency oxygen, hypoxia may lead to loss of consciousness and a subsequent loss of control of the aircraft. Modern airliners include a pressurized pure oxygen tank in the cockpit, giving the pilots more time to bring the aircraft to a safe altitude. The time of useful consciousness varies according to altitude. As the pressure falls the cabin air temperature may also plummet to the ambient outside temperature with a danger of hypothermia or frostbite.

For airliners that need to fly over terrain that does not allow reaching the safe altitude within a maximum of 30 minutes, pressurized oxygen bottles are mandatory since the chemical oxygen generators fitted to most planes cannot supply sufficient oxygen.

In jet fighter aircraft, the small size of the cockpit means that any decompression will be very rapid and would not allow the pilot time to put on an oxygen mask. Therefore, fighter jet pilots and aircrew are required to wear oxygen masks at all times.

On June 30, 1971, the crew of Soyuz 11, Soviet cosmonauts Georgy Dobrovolsky, Vladislav Volkov, and Viktor Patsayev were killed after the cabin vent valve accidentally opened before atmospheric re-entry.

History

The aircraft that pioneered pressurized cabin systems include:
 Packard-Le Père LUSAC-11, (1920, a modified French design, not actually pressurized but with an enclosed, oxygen enriched cockpit)
 Engineering Division USD-9A, a modified Airco DH.9A (1921 – the first aircraft to fly with the addition of a pressurized cockpit module)
 Junkers Ju 49 (1931 – a German experimental aircraft purpose-built to test the concept of cabin pressurization)
 Farman F.1000 (1932 – a French record breaking pressurized cockpit, experimental aircraft)
 Chizhevski BOK-1 (1936 – a Russian experimental aircraft)
 Lockheed XC-35 (1937 – an American pressurized aircraft. Rather than a pressure capsule enclosing the cockpit, the monocoque fuselage skin was the pressure vessel.)
 Renard R.35 (1938 – the first pressurized piston airliner)
 Boeing 307 Stratoliner (1938 – the first pressurized airliner to enter commercial service)
 Lockheed Constellation (1943 – the first pressurized airliner in wide service)
 Avro Tudor (1946 – first British pressurized airliner)
 de Havilland Comet (British, Comet 1 1949 – the first jetliner, Comet 4 1958 – resolving the Comet 1 problems)
 Tupolev Tu-144 and Concorde (1968 USSR and 1969 Anglo-French respectively – first to operate at very high altitude)
 Cessna P210 (1978) First commercially successful pressurized single-engine aircraft

In the late 1910s, attempts were being made to achieve higher and higher altitudes. The flight was possible by releasing stored oxygen into the cockpit, which was released directly into an enclosed cabin and not to an oxygen mask, which was developed later. With this system flights nearing  were possible, but the lack of atmospheric pressure at that altitude caused the pilot's heart to enlarge visibly, and many pilots reported health problems from such high altitude flights. Some early airliners had oxygen masks for the passengers for routine flights.

In 1921, a Wright-Dayton USD-9A reconnaissance biplane was modified with the addition of a completely enclosed air-tight chamber that could be pressurized with air forced into it by small external turbines. The chamber contained only one instrument, an altimeter, while the conventional cockpit instruments were all mounted outside the chamber, visible through five small portholes. The first attempt to operate the aircraft was again made by Lt. John A. McCready, who discovered that the turbine was forcing air into the chamber faster than the small release valve provided could release it. As a result, the chamber quickly over pressurized, and the flight was abandoned. A second attempt had to be abandoned when the pilot discovered at  that he was too short to close the chamber hatch. The first successful flight was finally made by test pilot Lt. Harrold Harris, making it the world's first flight by a pressurized aircraft.

The first airliner to enter commercial service with a pressurized cabin was the Boeing 307 Stratoliner, built in 1938, prior to World War II, though only ten were produced  before the war interrupted production. The 307's "pressure compartment was from the nose of the aircraft to a pressure bulkhead in the aft just forward of the horizontal stabilizer."

World War II was a catalyst for aircraft development. Initially, the piston aircraft of World War II, though they often flew at very high altitudes, were not pressurized and relied on oxygen masks. This became impractical with the development of larger bombers where crew were required to move about the cabin and this led to the first bomber with cabin pressurization (though restricted to crew areas), the Boeing B-29 Superfortress. The control system for this was designed by Garrett AiResearch Manufacturing Company, drawing in part on licensing of patents held by Boeing for the Stratoliner.

Post-war piston airliners such as the Lockheed Constellation (1943) made the technology more common in civilian service. The piston-engined airliners generally relied on electrical compressors to provide pressurized cabin air. Designing a pressurized fuselage to cope with that altitude range was within the engineering and metallurgical knowledge of that time. The introduction of jet airliners required a significant increase in cruise altitudes to the  range, where jet engines are more fuel efficient. That increase in cruise altitudes required far more rigorous engineering of the fuselage, and in the beginning not all the engineering problems were fully understood.

It was the first time that a large diameter, pressurized fuselage with windows had been built and flown at this altitude. Initially, the design was very successful but two catastrophic airframe failures in 1954 resulting in the total loss of the aircraft, passengers and crew grounded what was then the entire world jet airliner fleet. Extensive investigation and groundbreaking engineering analysis of the wreckage led to a number of very significant engineering advances that solved the basic problems of pressurized fuselage design at altitude. The critical problem proved to be a combination of an inadequate understanding of the effect of progressive metal fatigue as the fuselage undergoes repeated stress cycles coupled with a misunderstanding of how aircraft skin stresses are redistributed around openings in the fuselage such as windows and rivet holes.

The critical engineering principles concerning metal fatigue learned from the Comet 1 program were applied directly to the design of the Boeing 707 (1957) and all subsequent jet airliners. For example, detailed routine inspection processes were introduced, in addition to thorough visual inspections of the outer skin, mandatory structural sampling was routinely conducted by operators; the need to inspect areas not easily viewable by the naked eye led to the introduction of widespread radiography examination in aviation; this also had the advantage of detecting cracks and flaws too small to be seen otherwise. Another visibly noticeable legacy of the Comet disasters is the oval windows on every jet airliner; the metal fatigue cracks that destroyed the Comets were initiated by the small radius corners on the Comet 1's almost square windows. The Comet fuselage was redesigned and the Comet 4 (1958) went on to become a successful airliner, pioneering the first transatlantic jet service, but the program never really recovered from these disasters and was overtaken by the Boeing 707.

Even following the Comet disasters, there were several subsequent catastrophic fatigue failures attributed to cabin pressurisation. Perhaps the most prominent example was Aloha Airlines Flight 243, involving a Boeing 737-200. In this case, the principal cause was the continued operation of the specific aircraft despite having accumulated 35,496 flight hours prior to the accident, those hours included over 89,680 flight cycles (takeoffs and landings), owing to its use on short flights; this amounted to more than twice the number of flight cycles that the airframe was designed to endure. Aloha 243 was able to land despite the substantial damage inflicted by the decompression, which had resulted in the loss of one member of the cabin crew; the incident had far-reaching effects on aviation safety policies and led to changes in operating procedures.

This combination, while providing for increasing comfort, necessitated making Concorde a significantly heavier aircraft, which in turn contributed to the relatively high cost of a flight. Unusually, Concorde was provisioned with smaller cabin windows than most other commercial passenger aircraft in order to slow the rate of decompression in the event of a window seal failing. The high cruising altitude also required the use of high pressure oxygen and demand valves at the emergency masks unlike the continuous-flow masks used in conventional airliners. The FAA, which enforces minimum emergency descent rates for aircraft, determined that, in relation to Concorde's higher operating altitude, the best response to a pressure loss incident would be to perform a rapid descent.

The designed operating cabin altitude for new aircraft is falling and this is expected to reduce any remaining physiological problems. Both the Boeing 787 Dreamliner and the Airbus A350 XWB airliners have made such modifications for increased passenger comfort. The 787's internal cabin pressure is the equivalent of  altitude resulting in a higher pressure than for the  altitude of older conventional aircraft; according to a joint study performed by Boeing and Oklahoma State University, such a level significantly improves comfort levels. Airbus has stated that the A350 XWB provides for a typical cabin altitude at or below , along with a cabin atmosphere of 20% humidity and an airflow management system that adapts cabin airflow to passenger load with draught-free air circulation. The adoption of composite fuselages eliminates the threat posed by metal fatigue that would have been exacerbated by the higher cabin pressures being adopted by modern airliners, it also eliminates the risk of corrosion from the use of greater humidity levels.

See also
Aerotoxic syndrome
Air cycle machine
Atmosphere (unit)
Compressed air
Fume event
Rarefaction
Space suit
Time of useful consciousness

Footnotes

General references
 
 
 Cornelisse, Diana G. Splendid Vision, Unswerving Purpose; Developing Air Power for the United States Air Force During the First Century of Powered Flight. Wright-Patterson Air Force Base, Ohio: U.S. Air Force Publications, 2002. . pp. 128–29.
 Portions from the United States Naval Flight Surgeon's Manual
 "121 Dead in Greek Air Crash", CNN

External links
 

Aerospace engineering
Pressure vessels
Aviation safety

ja:与圧#航空機